Kariana is a town and former non-salute princely state on Saurashtra peninsula, in Gujarat, western India.

History
The Seventh Class princely state, in Gohelwar prant, was ruled by Kathi Chieftains. It comprised the town and eight more villages, with a combined population of 2,265 in 1901, yielding 20,000 Rupees state revenue (1903-4, mostly from land), paying 1,157 Rupees tribute, to the British and Junagadh State.

References

Princely states of Gujarat
Kathi princely states